Eutropis ashwamedhi, also known commonly as the Ashwamedh supple skink or Ashwamedha writhing skink, is a species of lizard in the family Scincidae. The species is endemic to India.

Geographic range
E. ashwamedhi is found in the Indian state of Andhra Pradesh.

Habitat

Reproduction
The mode of reproduction of E. ashwamedhi is unknown.

References

Further reading
Das I (1996). Biogeography of the Reptiles of South Asia. Malabar, Florida: Krieger Publishing Company.
Sharma RC (1969). "Two new lizards of the genera Mabuya Fitzinger and Riopa Gray (Scincidae) from India". Bulletin of Systematic Zoology, Calcutta 1 (2): 71–75. (Riopa ashwamedhi, new species). 

Eutropis
Reptiles described in 1969
Reptiles of India
Endemic fauna of India
Taxa named by Ramesh Chandra Sharma